Jan Kleyn (18 April 1925 – 1 April 2009) was a Dutch sprinter. He competed at the 1948 Summer Olympics in the 100 m event, but failed to reach the final due to an injury.

Kleyn won three national titles in the 100 m and 200 m events in 1947 and 1949. He set two national records in the 4 × 200 m relay and competed in nine international matches. Being an officer of the Dutch Royal Airforce, he won the 100 m and 200 m events at the 1946 and 1947 Inter-Allied Athletics Championships. After retiring from competitions he  worked as the sales director of a major insurance company; in parallel, he was chairman of the technical committee of the Dutch track and field federation (1962–1972).

References

1925 births
2009 deaths
Athletes (track and field) at the 1948 Summer Olympics
Dutch male sprinters
Olympic athletes of the Netherlands
People from Lingewaal
Royal Netherlands Air Force officers
Sportspeople from Gelderland